Jane Kidd  (born 1952 in Victoria, British Columbia) is a Canadian textile artist based out of Salt Spring Island, Canada.

Biography
Kidd studied at the University of Victoria and Vancouver School of Art. She taught in the Fibre program of the Alberta College of Art and Design from 1979 - 2010 and was recognized as Lecturer Emeritus in 2013. Kidd has presented on her work at the Canadian Crafts Federation Symposium and The Textile Society of America Symposium.

Kidd received the Alberta Craft Council Award of Excellence in 2008, and in 2016 won the Governor General’s Award in Visual and Media Arts Saidye Bronfman Award for her contribution to fine craft. Kidd's tapestry works are in the permanent collections of the Glenbow Museum, the Canada Council Art Bank, and the Canadian Museum of Civilization. She is a member of the Royal Canadian Academy of Arts.

While originally educated in modernist aesthetics, Kidd's primary medium is hand-woven tapestry. Her work explores historical and contemporary issues such as material culture, the handmade, and the environment.

Selected works 
 Land Sentence
 Handwork Series: to the bone, in the blood, from the heart (fragments 1-9)
 Wonderland Series
 Possession Series
 Curiosities

References

External links 
 Jane Kidd, textile artist and 2016 Canada Council laureate - a film by Black Rhino Creative
 Artist's Website

1952 births
Living people
20th-century Canadian artists
20th-century Canadian women artists
21st-century Canadian artists
21st-century Canadian women artists
Artists from Victoria, British Columbia
Canadian textile artists
Members of the Royal Canadian Academy of Arts
Tapestry artists
Women textile artists